Indiana Mall is a one-level indoor regional mall located in Indiana, Pennsylvania, United States. It has  of retail space and over 50 stores. It is located on the western edge of town near the intersection of Oakland Ave (PA 286) and Indian Springs Road (US 422 Business). The anchor stores are MovieScoop Cinemas, Harbor Freight Tools, Kohl's, and JCPenney.

History 
Old Navy joined the mall in 2006, and closed six years later. The mall's movie theater, formerly owned by Carmike Cinemas, was sold to Golden Star Theaters in 2015. On June 6, 2017, Sears Holdings announced that the Kmart store would be closing as part of a plan to close 72 stores nationwide. It closed in October 2017. Kmart was expanded in 1992. On November 2, 2017, Sears Holdings announced that the Sears store would also be closing as part of a plan to close 63 stores nationwide. The store closed in January 2018. Four months later, The Bon-Ton announced that it would close its location here as part of the storewide liquidations due to bankruptcy. Kohl's joined the mall in 2019, taking over the vacant Sears space.

Indiana Mall was turned over to the bank by Zamias in December 2020. Zamias remained as mall management. Dunham's Sports was also announced to replace the former Bon-Ton. Indiana Mall was sold to the Kohan Retail Investment Group in April 2022 for $6.9 million.

References

External links

Shopping malls in Pennsylvania
Indiana, Pennsylvania
Buildings and structures in Indiana County, Pennsylvania
Shopping malls established in 1979
1979 establishments in Pennsylvania
Tourist attractions in Indiana County, Pennsylvania
Kohan Retail Investment Group